Eriogonum gracilipes is a species of wild buckwheat known by the common name White Mountains buckwheat.

It is found in granite and sandstone gravels on the slopes of the southern Sierra Nevada and Inyo Mountains of California and the White Mountains of California and Nevada.

Description
Eriogonum gracilipes is a small perennial herb that grows in flat mats up to 20 centimeters wide. Its leaves, each under two centimeters long, have a coat of dense white hairs and grow in packed clusters on the ground.

The plant blooms in stalks holding rounded clusters of bright raspberry red flowers, each only a few millimeters wide.

External links
Jepson Manual Treatment
Photo gallery

gracilipes
Flora of California
Flora of Nevada
Flora of the Sierra Nevada (United States)
~
~
~
Natural history of Inyo County, California
Flora without expected TNC conservation status